Dao Minh Quan (born Đào Minh Quân in 1952 in South Vietnam) is a Vietnamese-American politician. He is the 3rd President of the Third Republic of Vietnam, a claimed government in exile. He is known for starting the Vietnam New Democratic Movement.

On June 19, 2022, Dao Minh Quan, supported by his political party, declared the republican government will merge with the monarchy with himself as the "Emperor of Vietnamese Empire". However, due to disagreements with other political parties of Vietnamese people in the United States, the organization will be reorganized in early November, 2022.

Early life and education
Quân was born in Thị Nghè village, Gia Định Province, in South Vietnam to Đào Thế (father) and Nguyễn Thị Hạnh (mother). He claims to be a descendent of the Grand Prince of Trần Hưng Đạo.

He attended Phan Thanh Giản school until 1968. Quân participated in a Commando course at Sơn Trà/Non Nước military base when he was 16 years old. During the Vietnam War, he assisted Robert D. Ohman and later became the First Lieutenant of the 122nd Battalion. He was then promoted as the Lieutenant Commander of a special force unit called "Black Tiger."

In 1980, he immigrated to Los Angeles, United States with his family as political refugees. He studied Computer Programming at Rancho Santiago Community College.

Career
Đào became a politician in 1971 and started the Vietnam New Democratic Movement in 1987.

Đào Minh Quân and Nguyễn Hậu, the President of the General Association of Communist Political Prisoners, created illegal files for political prisoners in Vietnam starting in 1990. This helped ARVN soldiers reunite with their families. Đào also initiated a program called C.P.A. (Comprehensive Plan of Action) to help Vietnamese refugees settle in the United States.

He was invited to the Host Committee in 1990 for the U.S. Republican Party. In 1991 he was voted as the Prime Minister of the Provisional National Government of Vietnam which was newly founded. It served as a self-proclaimed provisional government of Vietnam.

He established his political party, 3rd Republic of Vietnam, on 16 February 2018. It also serves as a self-proclaimed provisional government of Vietnam. Đào was voted and elected as the Third President of the Republic of Vietnam, as also self-proclaimed; or the First President of the newly founded Third Republic of Vietnam. He was accepted and was inaugurated on 11 November 2018 in Adelanto, California.

Đào has received two diplomatic notes from former American President Bill Clinton. The Provisional Government of Ukraine also invited him to give a speech at the congress of the Soviet Union. On October 15, 2010, U.S. Representative Gary Miller and Edward Nixon invited Đào as Prime Minister of the Provisional National Government of Vietnam to claim sovereignty in the South China Sea at the Nixon Library.

Đào built a tributary monument named called the Hexagon Monument as a tribute to the US government, military, and the American people.

Controversy
Đào's political party has been designated as a terrorist organization by the website of the Ministry of Public Security in Vietnam.

Members of Đào's political party have appeared in the People's Court of Ho Chi Minh City on the crime of overthrowing the Government of Vietnam, including a bombing and arson at a police facility and an unsuccessful bombing attempt at an airport, presumably Tan Son Nhat Intl.

See also
Third Republic of Vietnam

References

Living people
1952 births
Vietnamese expatriates in the United States
Vietnamese dissidents
South Vietnamese military personnel
South Vietnamese dissidents
South Vietnamese politicians